Michael Jackson (1958-2009) was an American musician and entertainer. He is known to have written, recorded, and filmed material that has never been officially released. Many of his unreleased songs have been registered—usually by his company Mijac Music—with professional bodies such as the United States Copyright Office, the Songwriters Hall of Fame, Broadcast Music Incorporated (BMI), American Society of Composers, Authors, and Publishers (ASCAP), the Canadian Musical Reproduction Rights Agency (CMRRA) and EMI Music Publishing. This list, however, only documents the songs explicitly cited as unreleased and therefore does not contain every unreleased Jackson song registered with such bodies.

Many officially unreleased Jackson songs had been scheduled, at one point, for release, through ways such as his six solo studio albums with music label Epic Records: Off the Wall (1979), Thriller (1982), Bad (1987), Dangerous (1991), HIStory (1995) and Invincible (2001) and the remix album Blood on the Dance Floor: HIStory in the Mix (1997). For varying reasons, the tracks were rejected and, as of 2023, remain unreleased. Jackson's unreleased material includes songs recorded as a solo artist (including covers of songs released by other artists and the Jackson 5 songs) and demo versions, some featuring established artists such as Freddie Mercury and Barry Gibb.

In 2009, after Jackson's sudden death, La Toya Jackson said that she had discovered two hard disks at her brother's home that contained more than 100 unreleased songs, many of which were unregistered. Several of Jackson's songs have been leaked onto the Internet, such as a 24-second segment of "A Place with No Name" leaked by TMZ.com following Jackson's death. At the time of the leak, it was claimed that there were "hundreds" of unreleased songs by Jackson, and that they could be issued for years to come. The curator of the Rock and Roll Hall of Fame, Jim Henke, noted that any future releases would garner significant attention. On March 16, 2010, Sony Music Entertainment signed a record-breaking $250 million deal with Jackson's estate to retain distribution rights to his recordings until 2017 and release ten posthumous albums—some of which will feature unreleased material—over the next decade (This however did not come to fruition as only 3 posthumous albums were released). Note: This list isn't complete.

Key

Songs

See also
 List of songs recorded by Michael Jackson
 List of songs recorded by the Jackson 5

References

Footnotes

Bibliography

 
 
 
 
 

 
Jackson, Michael